St. George Academy is a historic school building located in St. George, Tucker County, West Virginia, USA. Construction started in 1885 and finished in 1886, and is a two-story clapboard building with a projecting bay.  It features a square tower with a peaked vent on each side and topped by a pyramidal roof with a spiked finial.  In 1975–76, a new school was erected behind the old academy structure, and in 1982, the old school building was condemned by the state fire marshal and ordered to be razed or removed.  It was moved to its present site in 1985 by the local historical society, and houses a local history museum.

It was listed on the National Register of Historic Places in 2001.

References

Defunct schools in West Virginia
Former school buildings in the United States
History museums in West Virginia
Museums in Tucker County, West Virginia
National Register of Historic Places in Tucker County, West Virginia
School buildings completed in 1886
School buildings on the National Register of Historic Places in West Virginia
Schools in Tucker County, West Virginia